Mysmeniola is a genus of spiders in the family Mysmenidae. It was first described in 1995 by Thaler. , it contains only one species, Mysmeniola spinifera, found in Venezuela.

References

Mysmenidae
Monotypic Araneomorphae genera
Spiders of South America